Juan Barahona (born 19 August 1961) is a Chilean sailor. He competed in the 470 event at the 1984 Summer Olympics.

References

External links
 

1961 births
Living people
Chilean male sailors (sport)
Olympic sailors of Chile
Sailors at the 1984 Summer Olympics – 470
Place of birth missing (living people)